Kasuganishiki Takahiro (born August 22, 1975 as Takahiro Suzuki) is a former sumo wrestler from Misaki, Isumi District, Chiba Prefecture, Japan. He made his debut in 1991, reaching the top makuuchi division in 2002. His highest rank was maegashira 5. He retired in 2011 and became an elder of the Japan Sumo Association under the name Takenawa, but admitted involvement in match-fixing after text messages were found on his mobile phone that showed he had arranged the result of bouts with fellow wrestlers the previous year. His testimony was part of the Sumo Association's investigation into the affair which led to 22 other wrestlers being found guilty, most of whom were ordered to retire. Given a two-year suspension, he  instead left sumo completely.

Career
He made his professional debut in March 1991 (the same tournament as Chiyotenzan) and was immediately given the shikona or fighting name of Kasuganishiki, based on the name of his stable, Kasugano. He used the same shikona throughout his career. After eight years in the unsalaried lower divisions, he reached the jūryō division for the first time in July 1999, but could win only two matches. However, he re-established himself as a sekitori in 2001.

He had a stroke of good fortune in the May 2002 tournament, when no fewer than three of his scheduled opponents had to withdraw due to injuries, an extremely rare occurrence. Thus only six of his nine wins in that tournament came through actual fights, the rest being fusensho, or default wins. He followed up with a strong 11–4 record in the next tournament, which earned him promotion to the top makuuchi division for the first time in September 2002.

However, he suffered a number of injuries after that, having to sit out the May 2004 tournament completely due to cartilage damage in his right knee, which cost him his place in the top division. On his return in March 2005, he had to withdraw after only four days. He spent 20 tournaments in makuuchi in total, but did not have a kachi-koshi or winning score there after January 2007. He returned to the top division for November 2008, after a year's absence, following a 9–6 score at jūryō 3 and a high number of vacancies. He had to withdraw due to an injury during the Kyushu tournament and fell to the second division once again.

He is known for sociable and good-natured personality, and enjoys fishing as a hobby.

He was suspended along with over a dozen other wrestlers from the July 2010 tournament after admitting involvement in illegal betting on baseball. As a result, he fell to the makushita division in September, where he remained until announcing his retirement in January 2011.

Retirement from sumo and match-fixing claims
Kasuganishiki remained in sumo as a coach at his stable under the name Takenawa Oyakata. However, in February 2011 just a few days after his retirement announcement, news broke that police had discovered text messages on his mobile phone dating from the previous year, that indicated he had arranged the result of several matches with fellow juryo wrestlers in exchange for money. Of the 46 messages under suspicion, 22 were sent by the then-Kasuganishiki and 14 were received by him, and many describe what moves the wrestlers should make and how to make the bouts look convincing. He reportedly admitted his involvement after being questioned by the Sumo Association. Takenawa still received the severance pay awarded to retired sekitori (believed to be in the region of 15 million yen) as the match-fixing scandal did not surface until after he had retired from the ring. In March the Mainichi Daily News reported that Takenawa claimed about 40 other wrestlers were involved in the match-fixing scam, and that he first became exposed to yaocho in January 2006 when a sanyaku wrestler asked him to throw a bout.  He refused on that occasion, but later became involved when injuries sent him down to juryo. His stablemaster Kasugano denied the story, while Takenawa himself refused to comment.

In April, 23 wrestlers and coaches were found guilty of match-fixing. Although most were ordered to retire, Takenawa because of his admission of wrongdoing was given the lighter penalty of a two-year suspension. However, he indicated his intention to resign.

Fighting style

Kasuganishiki's favourite techniques are listed on his profile at the Sumo Association as pushing and thrusting, or tsuki/oshi, but his most common winning move in his career was actually yori-kiri, or force out, using the opponent's mawashi or belt. He also regularly used oshi-dashi, the push out, and hataki-komi, the slap down.

Career record

See also
Glossary of sumo terms
List of past sumo wrestlers

References

External links
 

1975 births
Living people
Japanese sumo wrestlers
Sumo people from Chiba Prefecture
Sportspeople involved in betting scandals